Deltoblastus is a genus of blastoid echinoderms that lived in the Permian. Its fossils are known from Asia.

References

 Fossils (Smithsonian Handbooks) by David Ward (Page 190)

External links
Deltoblastus in the Paleobiology Database

Blastozoa genera
Permian echinoderms
Permian animals of Asia